Devil Hopping is the fourth studio album from British indie band Inspiral Carpets, released on 7 March 1994 via Mute Records. The single version of "I Want You" features vocals by Mark E. Smith of The Fall. Mute dropped the band after the release of Devil Hopping.

The title of the album came from producer Pascal Gabriel's pronunciation of the word "developing."

Critical reception
The Chicago Tribune wrote that "with driving guitars and Martin Walsh's booming bass lines, Devil Hopping edges toward a punchier rock sound." Trouser Press wrote that "the nearly lifeless music is at best self-parodic; the lyrics are hopelessly trite."

Track listing
All tracks by Inspiral Carpets.

LP: Cow Records / DUNG 25 (UK)
"I Want You" – 3:10
"Party in the Sky" – 3:52
"Plutoman" – 4:15
"Uniform" – 3:54
"Lovegrove" – 3:18
"Just Wednesday" – 3:43
"Saturn 5" – 3:59
"All of This and More" – 3:32
"The Way the Light Falls" – 4:55
"Half Way There" – 3:50
"Cobra" – 2:13
"I Don't Want to Go Blind" – 4:03

also released on CD (DUNG 25 CD)

LP: Cow Records / LDUNG 25 (UK)
Contains track listing as above, plus a red vinyl 10" featuring the following tracks:

"Saturn 5 (Peel Session)" – 3:50
"I Want You (Peel Session)" – 3:01
"The Way the Light Falls (Peel Session)" – 4:35
"Party in the Sky (Peel Session)" – 3:42

Peel Sessions first broadcast on 13 December 1993.
also available on CD (LDUNG 25 CD)

Singles
Dung 23 - "Saturn 5" (1994)
Dung 24 - "I Want You" (w/ Mark E. Smith) (1994)
Dung 26 - "Uniform" (1994)

Personnel
Inspiral Carpets
Clint Boon – keyboards, backing vocals
Craig Gill – drums
Tom Hingley – lead vocals
Graham Lambert – guitars
Martyn Walsh – bass

Technical personnel
Peter Ashworth – photography
Dave Buchanan – assistant
Pascal Gabriel – producer, mixing
Inspiral Carpets – producer
Lewis Mulatero – photography
Clif Norrell – engineer, mixing

References

1994 albums
Inspiral Carpets albums
Mute Records albums
Albums produced by Pascal Gabriel